Manikchand Group is a group of industries in India that primarily started out as a company that produced chewable tobacco products called 'juice'. Today, Manikchand Gutka is the leading producer of Gutkas in India, with One of the most successful gutka called RMD, which got quite famous for its brand ambassador Moiz Miya during the year 2018, 2019 and 2020.This enterprise is very famous for having sponsored the Filmfare Awards for many years.

Profile
This group was founded by Mr Rasik 'Manikchand' Dhariwal from a small town Shirur-Ghodnadi and named after his father 'Manikchand'. It is Headquartered in Pune, the Manikchand Group is a privately owned group of industries in India. It primarily started out as a company that produced chewable tobacco products called 'Gutka' around six decades ago. The group is diversified into Pan Masala, Mouth Freshner, Packaged Water(Oxyrich), Offset Printing, Wedding Cards(JRD Print pack), Flexible laminated Packaging(DIL), Electrical Switches(Xen), Flour Mills(MRFM), Construction, Water Bottle Preforms. Some of the industry products act as a front for surrogate advertising through the audio-video media channels due to strict restrictions or bans on tobacco advertising in India. Its products are exported to more than 30 countries worldwide.

Ownership
The company is owned by Prakash Rasiklal Dhariwal

References 

Tobacco companies of India
Manufacturing companies based in Pune
Companies with year of establishment missing